There are over 20,000 Grade II* listed buildings in England.  This page is a list of these buildings in the district of Bromsgrove in Worcestershire.

Bromsgrove

|}

Notes

References 
National Heritage List for England

External links

Bromsgrove
 Bromsgrovve
Lists of listed buildings in Worcestershire